Alan Ronald Mills,  (born 6 November 1935), is a former tennis player and tournament referee for the Wimbledon tennis championships from 1983 to 2005. Although each individual tennis match was controlled by an on-court umpire, Alan Mills ran the entire tournament. However, perhaps he was most well known because the decision to stop play in the event of rain was that of Mills, and so his face was familiar to millions of television viewers worldwide, in the corner of Centre Court, clutching his two-way radio and glancing upwards at the sky in search of rainclouds.

Tennis career
Mills was himself an accomplished tennis player. At the age of 17 he was the senior county champion in his home county of Lancashire, and he reached the last 16 in the men's singles at Wimbledon on two occasions. He was also the first man in the history of the Davis Cup to win a match with the scoreline 6–0, 6–0, 6–0, completing the match in just 32 minutes.

Mills was the first Englishman to defeat Rod Laver in 1961 at the London Hardcourt Championships when the Australian came to Britain.

He became a professional tennis coach in 1966 and played matches on the professional tour.

Personal life
He married English table tennis international Jill Rook in 1960.

References

Mills, A. (2005). Lifting the Covers.  – an autobiography of Alan Mills' 21 years as referee of the Wimbledon Championships

External links
 
 
 BBC News Online 'face of the week'

1935 births
Living people
Commanders of the Order of the British Empire
English male tennis players
People from Stretford
Wimbledon Championships
Professional tennis players before the Open Era
British male tennis players
Tennis people from Greater Manchester